Mark Scanlon (born 10 October 1980 in Cranmore, Sligo) is an Irish former professional road racing cyclist, who was the first Irishman to ride in the Tour de France since 1993. He also competed in the 2004 Summer Olympics.

Amateur career
Scanlon came to prominence when he won the junior race at the 1998 world road race championship, on his 18th birthday.

After winning the world championships, Scanlon signed for the Rabobank cycling team's development squad.  He failed to break through because of injuries and he left in 2000.  He joined CC Etupes in France and rode lesser French races.  Linda McCartney Racing Team offered him a contract in 2001 but folded before he joined them.  Scanlon continued to ride in France with VC Nantes 44 and then VC La Pomme Marseille. In 2002 he won the Irish road championship.

Professional career
Scanlon signed for AG2R Prévoyance for 2003.  He won a stage of that year's Tour of Denmark, leading the race for three days.  He won the Irish championship again.  

In 2004 Scanlon became the first Irishman in the Tour de France since Stephen Roche in 1993.  He also represented Ireland in the 2004 Summer Olympics in the road race on the opening day of the Games.  Scanlon was injured for much of 2005 and 2006 but rode the 2006 Giro d'Italia.

He left the AG2R Prévoyance team at the end of 2006, disillusioned with the amount of racing required in the ProTour. At the start of 2007, he rode for the Toyota-United team in the USA. In 2007 there were reports he had retired. Scanlon denied them, saying he would like to captain a third division Irish continental team but for the time being, he had taken a "step back from professional cycling."

Major results

1997
 2nd Overall Junior Tour of Ireland
1st Stages 8 & 9
1998
 1st  Road race, UCI World Junior Road Championships 
 1st  Road race, National Junior Road Championships
 1st Overall Junior Tour of Ireland
1st Stages 1, 8 & 9
 1st Circuit Het Volk juniors
1999
 2nd Overall Tour of Ulster
 3rd Road race, National Road Championships
2000
 1st Overall Belfast–Dublin–Belfast
1st Stages 1 & 2
 Tour de Hokkaido
1st Stages 1 & 6
1st Points classification
 3rd Road race, National Road Championships
2001
 1st Stage 4 FBD Milk Rás
 2nd Road race, National Road Championships
2002
 1st  Road race, National Road Championships
 3rd Grand Prix d'Isbergues
 10th Time trial, UCI Under-23 Road World Championships
2003
 1st  Road race, National Road Championships
 5th Overall Danmark Rundt
1st Stage 1
 6th GP Ouest–France
2004
 1st Ühispanga Tartu GP
 1st E.O.S GP de Tallinn
 2nd GP de Denain
 4th Trophée des Grimpeurs
2005
 1st Stage 4 Circuit des Ardennes
 2nd Road race, National Road Championships
 3rd Overall Tour de la Somme
 3rd Tour du Doubs
2006
 5th Le Samyn

Grand Tour general classification results timeline

References

External links
Interview in Cyclingnews 2003
Interview in Cyclingnews 2004

1980 births
Living people
Cyclists at the 2004 Summer Olympics
Irish male cyclists
Olympic cyclists of Ireland
People educated at Summerhill College
Sportspeople from County Sligo